Brigadier General Evan Alexander Wisdom,  (29 September 1869 – 7 December 1945) was an Australian politician, businessman and a senior officer of the Australian Army in the First World War. He was the Mayor of the Municipality of Cottesloe from 1908 to 1911, served as the Western Australian Legislative Assembly Liberal member for Claremont for two terms between 1911 and 1917 and was the Administrator of the Territory of New Guinea from 1921 to 1933. He died in Melbourne aged 76, and was cremated.

Early life
Born on 29 September 1869 at Inverness, Scotland, the son of Francis William Wisdom and Mary, née Cameron. He attended his education at Inverness and Edinburgh. After his education he served in a militia infantry battalion and was later transferred to the Midlothian Coast Artillery.

He emigrated to Australia in 1891 to seek his fortune and settled in Western Australia, where he began as a prospector to Southern Cross at Yilgarn. In 1892, with the discovery of gold at Coolgardie, he went prospecting and found success. With the money made from his prospecting, he opened a store at Coolgardie. He later joined the gold rush at Kalgoorlie and again had success. He acquired extensive mining interests and set up the Exchange Hotel at Kalgoorlie.

Travelling back to Scotland in 1894, he married Agnes Bell Jackson on 16 April 1895 at Edinburgh. Together they emigrated to Western Australia and bought a house at Claremont, Perth. Retaining his business interests in the goldfields, he became active in the Citizens Military Force upon creation and was appointed lieutenant in the Western Australian Mounted Infantry, with the command of the Cannington troop. Promoted to captain in 1903 and in 1904, he was posted to militia headquarters in Perth. He later became the brigade major of the Western Australian Infantry Brigade in 1908. Fostering a desire to enter politics, he became the mayor of Cottesloe between 1908 and 1913 and later went on to be the Liberal member for Claremont in the Legislative Assembly in 1911–17.

First World War
With the outbreak of war, he was appointed the commandant of the Karrakatta training camp in 1914. Commissioned into the First Australian Imperial Force in March 1915 as brigade major of the 5th Brigade, serving with the brigade for the majority of the Gallipoli campaign. He was awarded the Distinguished Service Order for his services at Gallipoli. Given command of the 18th Battalion in February 1916 and arriving in France in March 1916. He led the battalion during the Battle of Pozières Heights and the Battles of the Somme. He was promoted to colonel and temporary brigadier general and appointed to command the 7th Brigade and led the brigade at the Battle of Lagnicourt in March 1917 and the Second Battle of Bullecourt in May. Wisdom was appointed the Companion of the Order of the Bath in June. He went on to command the brigade at battles which captured the  Menin Road, Broodseinde and Passchendaele.

During the western front campaign of 1918, he led the 7th Brigade at the Third Battle of Morlancourt in June, the Battle of Hamel in July, and took part in the Battle of Amiens, storming Mont St Quentin and then the Battle of Beaurevoir. Wisdom was appointed Companion of the Order of St Michael and St George for his leadership in January 1919. He had been mentioned in despatches six times. After the war he joined the Repatriation and Demobilization Department, in England.

Later life
Travelling back to Australia in December 1919, he was appointed to the chairmanship of the Central War Gratuities Board in May 1920. He was successful in applying for the post of administrator of the Mandated Territory of New Guinea at Rabaul and served this role from 21 March 1921 until 13 June 1933. As administrator of New Guinea, Wisdom protected a system of indentured labor that allowed planters, traders and mining companies to extract the resources of New Guinea.

His wife took ill during his appointment and they travelled to Sydney, where she died in November 1931.

He went on to resuming his business interests in Western Australia, while living in Melbourne. He died without issue on 7 December 1945 at St. Andrews Hospital in Melbourne and was cremated.

Citations

References

1869 births
1945 deaths
Australian generals
Australian military personnel of World War I
Australian Companions of the Distinguished Service Order
Australian Companions of the Order of St Michael and St George
Australian Companions of the Order of the Bath
Mayors of places in Western Australia
Members of the Western Australian Legislative Assembly
Scottish emigrants to Australia
Administrators of the Territory of New Guinea
Scottish military personnel